Christopher Todd Jones (born August 7, 1971) is a former American football wide receiver who played in the National Football League. He was drafted by the Philadelphia Eagles in the third round of the 1995 NFL Draft. He played college football at Miami.

Jones also played for the Oakland Raiders.

College career
Jones played for the Miami Hurricanes from 1991 to 1994, recording career totals of 105 receptions and 11 touchdowns on 1,640 receiving yards. He earned All-Big East First-team honors in 1993 and 1994.

Professional career

Philadelphia Eagles
Jones was drafted by the Philadelphia Eagles with the 78th pick of the 1995 NFL Draft. He played in 32 games, starting 17, for the Eagles from 1995 to 1997. He was released by the Eagles on August 20, 1998 as the team believed he could not come back from knee injuries.

Oakland Raiders
Jones signed with the Oakland Raiders on February 13, 1999. He was expected to be lost for up to six weeks after suffering a sprained left knee on August 15, 1999 in a pre-season game against the Dallas Cowboys. He was placed on injured reserve on September 3, 1999 as his injury was more severe than originally thought.

Professional career statistics

References

1971 births
Living people
American football wide receivers
African-American players of American football
Miami Hurricanes football players
Philadelphia Eagles players
Oakland Raiders players
Players of American football from Florida
Sportspeople from West Palm Beach, Florida
21st-century African-American sportspeople
20th-century African-American sportspeople